Abolsamad Khorramshahi is an Iranian lawyer.

Khorramshahi was involved in several controversial cases including detained British embassy political analyst Hossein Rassam who was arrested after Iran's disputed presidential election in 2009. He also represented Roxana Saberi, an Iranian-American journalist who was arrested on charges of espionage by the Iranian government, but was later released. Other cases in which Khorramshahi was involved include Delara Darabi and Shahla Jahed.

Notes

See also
Shirin Ebadi

21st-century Iranian lawyers
Living people
Year of birth missing (living people)